The 2015–16 Combined Counties Football League season (known as the 2015–16 Cherry Red Records Combined Counties Football League for sponsorship reasons) was the 38th in the history of the Combined Counties Football League, a football competition in England.

The league's constitution was announced on 29 May 2015.

Premier Division

The Premier Division was increased from 21 to 22 clubs, and featured three new teams after the promotion of Molesey to the Isthmian League, and the relegation of Frimley Green to Division One:

A.F.C. Hayes, relegated from the Southern League Division One Central.
Chessington & Hook United, promoted as third-placed club in Division One.
Redhill, relegated from the Isthmian League Division One South.
Mole Valley SCR F.C. changed their name to Sutton Common Rovers F.C.

Five clubs applied for promotion to Step 4: Ashford Town, Camberley Town, Epsom & Ewell, Hartley Wintney and Horley Town. Hartley Wintney failed the ground grading requirements.

League table

Division One

Division One was increased from 16 to 17 clubs, and featured four new teams after AFC Croydon Athletic were promoted and transferred to the Southern Counties East League, Chessington & Hook United were promoted to the Premier Division, and Alton Town transferred to the Wessex League:
Abbey Rangers, promoted from the Surrey Elite Intermediate League.
Dorking Wanderers Reserves, joining from outside the pyramid structure (Suburban League).
Frimley Green, relegated from the Premier Division.
South Park Reserves, joining from outside the pyramid structure (Suburban League).
Reserve sides are not eligible for promotion to Step 5.
In March 2016, Dorking Wanderers Reserves announced their resignation from the league effective at the end of the season. This was due to Dorking Wanderers and Dorking groundsharing at Dorking Wanderers during the 2016–17 season.

League table

References

External links
 Official Site

2015-16
9